Alexandrovo-Gaysky District is an administrative and municipal district (raion), one of the thirty-eight in Saratov Oblast, Russia. It is located in the southeast of the oblast. Its administrative center is the rural locality (a selo) of Alexandrov Gay. Population: 16,855 (2010 Census);  The population of Alexandrov Gay accounts for 57.7% of the district's total population.

References

Notes

Sources

Districts of Saratov Oblast